Vampyros Lesbos is a 1971 West German-Spanish erotic horror film directed and co-written by Jesús Franco. The film stars Ewa Strömberg as Linda Westinghouse, an American who works in a Turkish legal firm. Westinghouse has a series of erotic dreams that involve a mysterious vampire woman who seduces her before feeding on her blood. When she travels to an island to settle an inheritance, Linda recognizes a woman as the vampire from her dreams.

The film was shot in 1970 in Turkey. It was a popular success in theaters in Europe on its release and was the first film to have a more psychedelic score for a Franco film and the first to have a lesbian theme as a prominent feature of the film. The film's score became popular in the mid-1990s when it was included on the compilation Vampyros Lesbos: Sexadelic Dance Party, an album that became a top ten hit on the British Alternative charts.

Plot 
On a remote island, the beautiful vampire Countess Nadine Carody lures unwary victims with her seductive nightclub act and sets her sights on Linda. Linda begins dreaming about Nadine and seeks her home on an island. She is interrupted by Memmet, who warns her not to go to the island. Linda follows Memmet to his chamber, where she walks in on him torturing a young woman. She escapes this encounter and proceeds to the island where Linda meets Nadine. The two go swimming, and Nadine notes that the home they are staying at used to belong to Count Dracula. After Linda begins to feel dizzy from drinking wine, Nadine takes her to a room where the two have sex, and Nadine draws blood from Linda's neck. Linda later finds Nadine motionless in a swimming pool and faints.

The next day, Agra appears in mental distress at a hospital, where she claims to have visions of Nadine. She is under Dr. Seward's care, who then treats his new patient, Linda, who does not have any memory of what she encountered with Nadine. At Nadine's home, she appears alive and recounts to her servant Morpho how she became a vampire and her obsession with Linda, who she wishes to become a vampire. Nadine uses her powers to contact Linda to return to her island, where the two drink blood and have sex. On her return to the hospital, Dr. Seward informs Linda that to remove herself from the vampire's curse she must split the vampire's head with an axe or pierce it with a pole.

Memmet then kidnaps Linda, and her boyfriend Omar begins to search for her. Nadine later arrives at the asylum to have Linda return with her, where she meets Dr. Seward. Dr. Seward admits that he only attempted to help Linda to draw Nadine to him so he could become a vampire. Nadine refuses and has Morpho kill him. As Omar searches for Linda, she is told by Memmet that all women, including his wife Arga, who return from the island become insane, which has driven him to kill various women around the island. Linda manages to kill Memmet with a saw and escapes to find Nadine. She finds Nadine at her home near death, desperate for blood to survive. Linda ignores Nadine's plea, bites her neck, and stabs her with a pole through her left eye. Morpho commits suicide, and Linda is found by Omar, who tries to convince her that the whole experience was a dream.

Cast 

Ewa Strömberg as Linda Westinghouse (as Ewa Stroemberg)
Soledad Miranda as Countess Nadine Carody (as Susann Korda)
Andrea Montchal as Omar (as Viktor Feldmann)
Dennis Price as Dr. Alwin Seward
Paul Müller as Dr. Steiner
Heidrun Kussin as Agra
Michael Berling as Dr. Seward's assistant
Beni Cardoso as Dead woman (uncredited)
Jesús Franco as Memmet (uncredited)
José Martínez Blanco as Morpho (uncredited) (as J. Martinez Blanco)

Production
Vampyros Lesbos was filmed in Turkey between June 1 and July 10, 1970.  Franco applied film devices that were used in his previous film such as long strip club sequences and female protagonists while the lesbian subtext was more prominent in this film than any previous work. The music score also differs from the jazz soundtracks of his previous films with a more psychedelic music influenced soundtrack. The soundtrack was composed by Manfred Hübler, Siegfried Schwab and Jesús Franco who credited himself under the alias of David Khune. The film went under several titles before being released as Vampyros Lesbos including 'Das Mal des Vampirs (Evil of the Vampires) and Im Zeichen der Vampire (Mark of the Vampire). Less than a month after finishing production on Vampyros Lesbos, Franco began working on his next film She Killed in Ecstasy (1971).

Release
Vampyros Lesbos was released in July 15, 1971, in Germany and in Spain in 1973 where it was a popular with audiences in Europe.  The film was released on DVD by Synapse Video on January 4, 2000. Image Entertainment released the film on December 27, 2000, on DVD. It was released as a set by Severin Films in 2015 containing a high definition blu ray and a DVD with a Spanish bootleg of the film.

A remake of Vampyros Lesbos directed by Matthew Saliba was released in 2008. The film follows the story of Franco's film.

Reception

Total Film gave the film three stars out of five, noting that "Despite (or perhaps because of) the hilariously leaden acting, dull script and amateurish direction, this film still exerts a certain fascination." Jonathan Rosenbaum of The Chicago Reader gave the film a negative review, comparing director Jesús Franco to Ed Wood. The website Slant Magazine gave the film a positive review of three and half stars out of four, finding the film "effortlessly dreamlike" as well as praising the soundtrack. Film 4 gave the film a mixed review, noting that "you never come to Franco's films (over 150 of them) for the plots, but his dreamy, unsettling direction does develop the central tragedy of Carody's love for Westinghouse." as well as praising the film's soundtrack. The Dissolve, an online magazine, gave the film a three out of five star rating, find that large portions of the film "lapse into tedium, whether they're extensive love scenes or, worse, the blatherings of serious men with "Dr." before their names" as well as that the film "gave exploitation audiences something different, a mesmeric vibe" which originated from the film's score and the presence of Soledad Miranda.

In his 2009 book The Pleasure and Pain of Cult Horror Films: An Historical Survey, Bartomiej Paszylk took umbrage with some of the high-brow critics of the film, though ultimately acquiescing to its shortcomings, "Truth be told, Franco's vampyros are far more interested in being lesbos than in drinking human blood, but the movie is so mesmerizing and so outright sexy that you really shouldn't mind that.

Soundtrack

The compilation album Vampyros Lesbos: Sexadelic Dance Party was released on compact disc in 1995 by Motel Records, consisting of music that was first released in 1969 on the albums Psychedelic Dance Party (released under the name The Vampires' Sound Incorporation) and Sexadelic (released under the name Sexadelic). Franco repurposed music from these albums as the soundtracks for three of his films: Vampyros Lesbos, She Killed in Ecstasy and The Devil Came from Akasava. The 1995 compilation was released during a period where there was a resurgence of interest in space age pop music, a style focused on easy listening music from the 1950s and 1960s. The track "The Lions and the Cucumber" from the album was later used again on the soundtrack of Jackie Brown by American director Quentin Tarantino. The album is dedicated to actress Soledad Miranda.

The soundtrack was a top 10 hit on the British Alternative charts on its release over 20 years after the film was released. On September 29, 1997, a remix album titled The Spirit of Vampyros Lesbos was released. The album was a collection of remixes from various electronic artists including Two Lone Swordsmen, Cristian Vogel and Alec Empire who released their own mixes of the film's soundtrack.

Allmusic gave the album a rating of three stars out of five, referring to the album's music as "excruciating", noting as well that a track on the album is "built on a shameless ripoff of the "Satisfaction" guitar riff". Entertainment Weekly gave the album a B+ rating, opining that it was "not for cheese lovers only."

Track listing

See also 

 List of ghost films
List of horror films of 1971
List of German films: 1970s
List of Spanish films of 1971
Vampire films

Notes

References

External links 

1971 films
1971 horror films
1971 LGBT-related films
1970s erotic films
1995 soundtrack albums
1995 compilation albums
Dracula films
Erotic horror films
Films directed by Jesús Franco
Films set in Istanbul
Films set in Turkey
Films shot in Turkey
German erotic films
1970s German-language films
German LGBT-related films
German vampire films
Lesbian-related films
LGBT-related horror films
Spanish erotic films
Spanish LGBT-related films
Spanish vampire films
West German films
1970s German films
1970s Spanish films